Ismail Yassine (also credited as Ismail Yasseen;  ; 15 September 1912 - 24 May 1972) was an Egyptian comedian actor, and is considered as one of the greatest comedians in Egypt.

Personal life
Ismail Yassine had a difficult childhood in Suez where he was born. His mother died at an early age and his father was jailed thus forcing him to leave school before completing his primary education. He worked as a parking valet to support himself.

Career
He started his career as a monologue singer and headed for Cairo after Abo El Seoud El Ebiary, the comic screenwriter and his best friend and life partner had discovered him and had helped him to join Badi'a Masabny's troupe. His break into the movie industry came when Fouad El-Gazaery gave him his first role in the movie "Khalf El-Habayeb" in 1939. He later joined Ali El-Kassar's troupe and started to gain widespread recognition eventually becoming one of the most popular stars in the Arab world. A record 15 movies used his name in their titles to capitalize on his fame, most of them were written by Abo El Seoud El Ebiary.

He was widely known for manipulation of his facial expressions and often made fun of his 'large mouth' in his films. His trademark gimmick was to act terrified bringing his wobbling knees together, stretching his shaking arms in front of him, stammering silently, and suddenly snapping out of his panic with a loud inhalation of air. In the 1960s his health began to deteriorate. He moved to Lebanon where he participated in a number of films, and later when he returned to Egypt he was heavily in debt. He died of a heart attack in 1972. His son, Yassine Ismail Yassine, is also a famous Egyptian film director.

After a military regime took over in the 1952 revolution, another conscription narrative was swiftly established. From 1955 to 1959, Ismail Yassin, who had made numerous films with his name in the title, released five films as light propaganda for the army, e.g., Ismail Yassine fil-Geish (Ismail Yassine In the Army) in 1955.

Legacy
A Google Doodle on 15 September 2011 commemorated Yasin's 96th birth anniversary.

Filmography 
  1973 Essabet el Nissae 
  1969 Easabat Al'nisa
  1963 El majanin fi naim 
  1962 Malek el petrol 
  1961 Ismail Yassine fil sijn 
  1960 Hamati malak 
  1960 Shar assal basal 
  1960 Fanous el Sehry 
  1959 El ataba el khadra 
  1959 Ismail Yassine bolis harbi 
  1959 Ismail Yassine fil tayyaran 
  1959 Ismail Yassine lal baie 
  1959 Lokandet el mofagaat 
  1959 Rehla ilal kamar 
  1959 Hassan wa Marika 
  1958 Bahbah effendi 
  1958 Ismail Yasseen fi mostashfet al-maganin 
  1958 Ismail Yassine fil Dimashq 
  1958 Ismail Yassine fil ustul 
  1958 Ismail Yassine Tarazane 
  1957 El kommissariate el fatenate 
  1957 Ibn Hamidu
  1957 Ismail Yassine fi El Ostool
  1957 Ismail Yassine fi janainit al haiwanat 
  1957 Ismail Yassine fil madhaf el shami 
  1956 Ismail Yassine fil bolis 
  1956 Sahibat el azama 
 1956 Al-mufattish al-aam
  1955 Ismail Yassine fil geish 
  1955 Ismail Yassine yukabel Raya wa Sekina 
  1954 Beyt al Taa 
  1954 El anessa Hanafi 
  1954 El dunia lamma tidhak 
  1954 El hamawat el fatenat 
  1954 El liss el sharif 
  1954 El zulum haram 
  1954 Fail kheir 
  1954 Ismail Yassin Meets Frankenstein 
  1954 Kidbet April 
  1954 Lahn hubi 
  1954 Mughammarat Ismail Yassine 
  1954 Nachala hanem 
  1954 El sittat maarfoush yiktibu 
  1954 Afritet Ismail Yassine 
  1953 Bayn kalbain 
  1953 Bint el akaber 
  1953 Dahab 
  1953 Halal alayk 
  1953 Kalimat el hak 
  1952 Al-hawa maluush dawa 
  1952 Beit el nattash 
  1952 Hamati kombola zorria 
  1952 Katr el nada 
  1952 Min aina laka haza? 
  1952 Mismar Goha 
  1952 Soultanat al-sahra 
  1952 El saada el muharrama 
  1952 El muntasir 
  1951 El moallem Bulbul 
  1951 Fil hawa sawa 
  1951 Habibi katir 
  1951 Taa la salim 
  1950 Akbal el bakari 
  1950 Felfel 
  1950 Habibti Susu 
  1950 Sibuni aghani 
  1950 Sitt al hosn 
  1950 Akher kedba 
  1950 El Millioner
  1949 Agaza fel gahannam 
  1949 Ahebbak inta 
  1949 El nasseh 
  1949 Gawaher 
  1949 Sahibat el malilim 
  1949 Shari al-bahlawan 
  1949 Little Miss Devil 
  1949 Kalam el naas 
  1948 Khulud 
  1948 Ibn el fellah 
  1947 Al-sittat afarit 
  1947 Habib al omr 
  1946 Bolbol effendi 
  1945 Al-bani adam 
  1944 Naduga 
  1944 Tahia el sittat 
  1943 Hob min Al-samaa’
  1942 Ali Baba wa al arbain harame

See also 

 List of Egyptian films of the 1950s
 List of Egyptian films of the 1960s
 List of Egyptians

References

External links 
 

1912 births
1972 deaths
Egyptian male film actors
Egyptian comedians
20th-century Egyptian male actors
20th-century comedians